Central Energy Italian Inc is an Italian gas distribution and trade company. It is a part of Central Energy, a company related to Gazprom. A deal between Italian Eni and Gazprom picked CEI as a partner delivering gas to Italy.

Investigations by members of the Italian parliament revealed that Bruno Mentasti-Granelli, who is known as a close friend of Italian Prime Minister Silvio Berlusconi, owns 33 percent of CEIGH through two companies, Hexagon Prima and Hexagon Seconda.

The deal was denounced due to the spreading scandal. Italian parliament blocked the contract, accusing Berlusconi of having a personal interest in the contract.

Robert Nowikovsky, an Austrian lawyer linked to Russian operations, was one of the company's directors.

The 2008 article "Berlusconi, Centrex, Hexagon 1 and 2 and Gazprom" suggested:

References

External links
 

Oil and gas companies of Italy
Gazprom
Eni
Corporate scandals
Political scandals in Italy